Mohamad Hassan Hammoud (born 20 April 1980) is a Lebanese football coach and former player who is the goalkeeper coach of Ahed's youth setup.

Club career 
On 28 June 2020, Hammoud joined Bourj on a two-year contract from Ahed. On 7 October 2020, Bourj decided to suspend Hammoud indefinitely from the squad, due to an altercation with the team's goalkeeper coach. Bourj fans criticized Hammoud for seemingly throwing the game in their 3–2 defeat to Ahed.

On 20 April 2022, Hammoud played his only game of the 2021–22 season for Ahed on his 42nd birthday, captaining his side in a 3–0 win against Shabab Sahel.

Managerial career 
On 8 July 2021, Hammoud was appointed goalkeeper coach of Ahed's youth setup.

Honours
Ahed
 AFC Cup: 2019
 Lebanese Premier League: 2014–15, 2016–17, 2017–18, 2018–19, 2021–22
 Lebanese FA Cup: 2017–18, 2018–19
 Lebanese Elite Cup: 2013, 2015
 Lebanese Super Cup: 2015, 2017, 2018, 2019

Individual
 Lebanese Premier League Team of the Season: 2009–10, 2010–11, 2013–14, 2014–15
 Lebanese Premier League Best Goalkeeper: 2006–07

References

External links

 
 
 
 

1980 births
Living people
Footballers from Beirut
Lebanese footballers
Association football goalkeepers
Lebanese Premier League players
Al Ahed FC players
Bourj FC players
Lebanon international footballers
Association football goalkeeping coaches
AFC Cup winning players